C. Chhunga (1915-1988) was the first Chief Minister of Mizoram, a state in northeast India. He served as a member of the Mizo Union, from 1972 to 1977.

Political life
Chhunga was the Chief Executive Member of Mizoram District Council, The United Mizo Parliamentary Party, a coalition of Mizo Union and Congress Party and dominated the 1971 Village Council elections by winning 66 of the 158 Village councils. Chhunga was appointed the President of the Mizo Union in the 1952 General Assembly as the people preferred a young man instead of the much senior Bawichhuaka. Chhunga held the Party president's post for 14 years during the 28 years of Mizo Union Party. Chhunga won election in Kolasib (Vidhan Sabha constituency) and was appointed the Chief Minister of Union Territory of Mizoram by SP Mukherjee, the First Lt Governor of Mizoram on 3 May 1972. Chhunga was instrumental of merger of Mizo Union with the Indian National Congress. The Mizo Union being a regional party depended on the center for funds and preferred to join with the Indian National Congress. Chhunga was instrumental in Mizoram getting State status. He negotiated for separation of Mizoram District from Assam state.

References

External links
 Mizoram Government Website 
Election results 1972

Chief Ministers of Mizoram
People from Kolasib
1988 deaths
1915 births
Mizoram MLAs 1972–1977